Ondeikela is a village in Ohangwena Region, Namibia, in Omulonga Constituency.

Ondeikela was established in 1968 by Johannes Shapange. Ondeikela had 50 houses in the beginning, but has grown. Villagers are leaving to Okavango Region to find land for grazing.

References

Populated places in the Ohangwena Region